Emília Sičáková-Beblavá (born 1975 in Snina, Czechoslovakia) is a professor of Public Policy at the Comenius University in Bratislava. She is a prominent anti-corruption activist and a former head of the Slovak chapter of the Transparency International.  Currently, she is the director of the Institute of Public Policy, Department of Faculty of Social and Economic Sciences of the Comenius University in Bratislava.

Education
Sičáková-Beblavá holds a PhD from the University of Economics in Bratislava. Her dissertation focused on the role of multilateral institutions in fighting corruption. During her doctoral studies she was a Yale University World Fellow and participated in the Young Global Leaders training at Harvard.

Career

In 1998, Sičáková co-founded the Slovak chapter of Transparency International, and was a member of its worldwide Executive Board from 2001 until 2004. In 2004, she was one of the co-founders of the Public Policy Department at the Comenius University in Bratislava, which is now the Institute of Public Policy. Since 2016 she has served as the director of the Institute.

Personal life

She is married to Miroslav Beblavý, a former politician. They have two sons.

References

Biographies for World Ethics Forum conference April 2006
Emilia Sicakova-Beblava -- Slovakia's anti-corruption Joan of Arc

1975 births
Living people
People from Snina
Slovak activists
Slovak women activists
University of Economics in Bratislava alumni